Mu Leporis, Latinized from μ Leporis, is a star in the southern constellation of Lepus. The apparent visual magnitude is 3.259, making the star visible to the naked eye at night from the southern hemisphere. It is moving further from the Sun with a radial velocity of +27.7 km/s.

The stellar classification of this star is B9 IV:HgMn, although the ':' indicates an uncertain spectral value. The luminosity class of IV indicates that this is a subgiant that has exhausted the hydrogen at its core and it is in the process of evolving into a giant star. At present it has about 3.4 times the Sun's radius, 3.45 times the mass of the Sun, and is radiating 251 times the Sun's luminosity from its photosphere at an effective temperature of 12,800 K.

Mu Leporis is a suspected Alpha² Canum Venaticorum variable with a period of 2.933 days. The stellar spectrum of this star shows overabundances of mercury and manganese, as indicated by the HgMn in the stellar class. X-ray emission has been detected coming from a location at an angular separation of 0.93 arcseconds from this star. At the estimated distance of Mu Leporis, this equals a projected distance of 52 Astronomical Units. The source may be a stellar companion: either a star that has not yet reached the main sequence or a small, low-temperature star.

References

External links
Jim Kaler's Stars, University of Illinois: MU LEP (Mu Leporis)

Leporis, Mu
Lepus (constellation)
Leporis, 05
024305
B-type subgiants
Alpha2 Canum Venaticorum variables
033904
1702
Durchmusterung objects
Mercury-manganese stars